is a professional race car driver.

Complete Formula Nippon results 
(key) (Races in bold indicate pole position) (Races in italics indicate fastest lap)

References 

1966 births
Living people
Japanese racing drivers
Japanese Touring Car Championship drivers
Japanese Formula 3 Championship drivers
Formula Nippon drivers